Ishita Ganguly is an Indian television actress.

Career
Ganguly's first television series was Mrs Sinha Roy , a Bengali daily soap on Sananda TV. She then appeared to Colors TV's 2014 drama Shastri Sisters in which she portrayed Anushka Shastri opposite Vijayendra Kumeria, and rose to fame. In 2015, she made a cameo appearance in Star Plus's Tu Mera Hero and played an episodic role in &TV's horror series Darr Sabko Lagta Hai.

In 2016, Ganguly played Kamini Nehra in Colors TV's Ishq Ka Rang Safed opposite Mishal Raheja and Navya in episodic show Yeh Hai Aashiqui. She next took on the roles of Kashibai in Peshwa Bajirao for which she prepared horse riding and Rajkumari Amrusha in Prithvi Vallabh - Itihaas Bhi, Rahasya Bhi.

In 2018, she portrayed Nitya in Laal Ishq and Chandralekha/Raisa Rastogi in Kaun Hai?. Her next roles were in Vikram Betaal Ki Rahasya Gatha, Shrimad Bhagwat Mahapuran and Jag Janani Maa Vaishno Devi - Kahani Mata Rani Ki. She was also seen as Draupadi in RadhaKrishn and as Manasa in Vighnaharta Ganesha.

Television

Filmography
 2017 Meri Pyaari Bindu as special appearance, had Ayushmann Khurrana and Parineeti Chopra in the lead.
 2019 Rescue as Meera, directed by Nayan Pachori

References

External links 

 
 

Living people
21st-century Indian actresses
Indian television actresses
Actresses in Hindi television
1992 births